is a former long-distance runner from Japan.

Career
He graduated from Komazawa University, during the student has participated in Hakone Ekiden.

He won the 2000 edition of the Fukuoka Marathon, clocking 2:06:51 on December 3, 2000 – the second fastest run of 2000 after Antonio Pinto's time at the London Marathon. This also won him the Japanese title and remains the record for the national championship race. Fujita finished in sixth place (2:15:45) at the 1999 World Championships in Seville and twelfth at the 2001 World Championships in Athletics.

He also won the 2002 Seoul International Marathon and the 2007 edition of the Beppu-Ōita Marathon.

His career quietly came to an end in 2013, as in his final two performances at the Lake Biwa Marathon and the Nagano Marathon, he did not finish the distance.

In 2015 Fujita returned with a win at the Ishigakijima Marathon in Okinawa.

Achievements

References

External links
 
 藤田 敦史　Atsushi Fujita at JAAF 
 Marathoninfo

1976 births
Living people
Sportspeople from Fukushima Prefecture
Japanese male long-distance runners
Japanese male marathon runners
World Athletics Championships athletes for Japan
Japan Championships in Athletics winners
Komazawa University alumni
Fujitsu people
20th-century Japanese people